A maunch (from the French manche "sleeve") is a heraldic charge representing a detachable lady's sleeve with a wide pendulous cuff, as was fashionable amongst women in the 13th and 14th centuries. They are found most frequently in English heraldry, occurring to a lesser extent in the heraldry of France, Scotland, and other nations.

In the Middle Ages, it was common for ladies to give their sleeves as favours for knights to wear in tournaments. Thus, heraldic maunches came to symbolise that the armiger was popular with the ladies, or that he loved his wife. Alternatively maunches can occur as canting arms, such as in the arms of the Mohun and Mansel families. In French heraldry, they are referred to as manches mal taillée (meaning "badly cut sleeves") to distinguish them from ordinary sleeves.

In literature
In Sir Thomas Malory's Le Morte d'Arthur, Sir Lancelot fights in a tournament anonymously as an unknown knight using a white shield with a red sleeve on it. He also affixes Lady Elaine le Blanc's sleeve to his helmet to further disguise himself as he has never worn a lady's token of affection in a tournament.

References

Fox-Davies, Arthur Charles (1909), A complete guide to heraldry  New York : Dodge (1909) https://archive.org/details/cu31924029796608.

External links
http://www.heraldsnet.org/saitou/parker/Jpglossm.htm#Maunch

Heraldic charges